Brossa Espai Escènic (Brossa Scenic Space in Catalan) is a small theatre in Barcelona inaugurated in December 1997. It is intimately related to the creative universe of Joan Brossa i Cuervo and to the artistic and historic avant-garde activities and contemporary creation. Its founders and co-directors are actor and director Hermann Bonnín and magician Hausson.

External links
 Espaibrossa.com

Theatres in Catalonia